Minimol Abraham also known as Minomol Abraham (born 27 March 1988) is an Indian female volleyball player and current captain of the India women's national volleyball team. Minimol also plays for the domestic volleyball club India Railways in domestic league matches. She is considered one of the finest women volleyball players to have emerged from the state of Kerala along with Aswani Kiran, Poornima and Princy Joseph.

In 2012, she involved in a police case in which she was suspected to have harassed by three young men who allegedly pushed her down while she was walking and the case was later filed as an accidental case.

Career 
She was selected to represent India at the 2010 Asian Games, her maiden Asian Games appearance and was part of the squad which finished 9th in the women's team event. In July 2018, Minimol Abraham was appointed as the captain of the Indian national team for the 2018 Asian Games.

References 

1988 births
Living people
Indian women's volleyball players
Volleyball players at the 2010 Asian Games
Asian Games competitors for India
Volleyball players from Kerala
Volleyball players at the 2018 Asian Games